(Pleasant Wiederau, rejoice in thy meadows), BWV 30.1 (formerly BWV 30a), is a 1737 secular cantata by Johann Sebastian Bach, on a libretto by Christian Friedrich Henrici (Picander). Bach reused some of its music in later works, including Freue dich, erlöste Schar, BWV 30.2, one of his church cantatas, which was nearly entirely modelled after the secular composition.

History and text 

 was composed in Leipzig in 1737 by which time most of Bach's cantatas had already been completed. The work was performed on 28 September at Hennicke's .

The libretto of the cantata was written by Christian Friedrich Henrici (Picander), a frequent collaborator of the composer.

Scoring and structure 

The piece is scored for basso continuo , along with four vocal soloists (soprano as Zeit (Time), alto as Glück (Good Fortune), tenor as Elster (River Elster), bass as Schicksal (Fate)) and four-part choir.

The cantata has thirteen movements:

Chorus: 
Recitative (bass, soprano, alto, tenor): 
Aria (bass): 
Recitative (alto): 
Aria (alto): 
Recitative (bass): 
Aria (bass): 
Recitative (soprano): 
Aria (soprano): 
Recitative (tenor): 
Aria (tenor): 
Recitative (soprano, bass, alto): 
Chorus:

Music 
The eleventh movement, a tenor aria, is a reworking of a soprano aria from BWV 210. The other major movements were later reused in BWV 30.2, while the recitatives were newly composed.

Recordings 
 Amsterdam Baroque Orchestra & Choir; Ton Koopman. J.S. Bach: Complete Cantatas Vol. 22. Antoine Marchand
 Gächinger Kantorei, Bach-Collegium Stuttgart; Helmuth Rilling. Edition Bachakademie Vol. 139 – Congratulatory and Hommage Cantatas. Hänssler
 Leipziger Universitätschor, Neues Bachisches Collegium Musicum; Max Pommer. Kantate "Angenehmes Wiederau" BWV 30a. Eterna/Berlin Classic
 Les Chantres du Centre de Musique Baroque de Versailles/Café Zimmermann; Gustav Leonhardt. J.S. Bach: Weltliche Kantaten BWV 30a & 207 (Integrale delle Cantate profane Vol. 5). Alpha 118
Bach Collegium Japan, Masaaki Suzuki. J. S. Bach: Secular Cantatas, Vol. 10. BIS, 2018.

References

Sources 
 Alfred Dürr: Johann Sebastian Bach: Die Kantaten. Bärenreiter, Kassel 1999, 
 Alfred Dürr: The Cantatas of J.S. Bach, Oxford University Press, 2006. 
 Werner Neumann: Handbuch der Kantaten J.S.Bachs, 1947, 5th Ed. 1984, 
 Hans-Joachim Schulze: Die Bach-Kantaten: Einführungen zu sämtlichen Kantaten Johann Sebastian Bachs. Leipzig: Evangelische Verlags-Anstalt; Stuttgart: Carus-Verlag 2006  (Edition Bach-Archiv Leipzig)  (Evang. Verl.-Anst.),  (Carus-Verlag)
 Christoph Wolff/Ton Koopman: Die Welt der Bach-Kantaten Verlag J.B. Metzler, Stuttgart, Weimar 2006

External links 
 
 Z. Philip Ambrose. BWV 30a: Angenehmes Wiederau, freue dich in deinen Auen! – English translation of the libretto at University of Vermont website.
 Schloss Wiederau: Gerettet vor den Braunkohle-Baggern at   – history of Wiederau manor

Secular cantatas by Johann Sebastian Bach
1737 compositions